Pinewoods Camp is a traditional dance and music camp located on  of woodland between Long Pond and Round Pond in Plymouth, Massachusetts. It is the oldest continuously run folk dance camp in the U.S., and is arguably the most popular and well-known camp of its type.

History 
Initially known as "Pine Tree Camp", Pinewoods was founded in 1919 by Helen Osborne Storrow as the first National Girl Scout Leadership Training School.  In 1933, the facility was converted for use as a dance camp.  The name was changed to Pinewoods Camp in 1935. Storrow died in 1944, and left the property to Lily and Rick Conant, who operated the property until 1976. At that time, the Conants transferred its ownership to a newly created nonprofit organization, Pinewoods Camp, Inc., that now runs the facility. Pinewoods was added to the National Register of Historic Places in 2009.

Activities 

Each summer, Pinewoods Camp hosts over a dozen sessions, some of which are a week long, and others of which take place over a weekend. Each session features music and dancing educational programs for adults and is run by one of five Program Providers:

 The Country Dance and Song Society
 The Country Dance Society, Boston Centre 
 The Folk Arts Center of New England
 The Folk Music Society of New York
 Royal Scottish Country Dance Society, Boston Branch 
Pinewoods has played a central role in the development of country dance traditions in the United States.

Grounds and facilities

Pinewoods's facilities include four open-sided dance pavilions (C#, C# minor, Ampleforth and Newbiggin), a dining hall and kitchen, a camp house, and rustic cabins for up to 140 campers (plus offices, staff housing, and support facilities). Three of the pavilions and the dining hall were renovated as part of a recent capital campaign and are handicapped accessible, although some other facilities are not.

Gallery

See also
 Country dance
 Contra dance
 Folk music
 International folk dance

References

External links

 

Dance in the United States
National Register of Historic Places in Plymouth County, Massachusetts
Buildings and structures completed in 1919
Buildings and structures in Plymouth, Massachusetts
Summer camps in Massachusetts
Historic districts on the National Register of Historic Places in Massachusetts
Temporary populated places on the National Register of Historic Places